The State Council, constitutionally synonymous with the Central People's Government since 1954 (particularly in relation to local governments), is the chief administrative authority of the People's Republic of China. It is chaired by the premier and includes the heads of each of the constituent departments (ministries). Currently, the council has 35 members: the premier, one executive vice premier, three other vice premiers, five state councilors (of whom three are also ministers and one is also the secretary-general), and 26 in charge of the Council's constituent departments. The State Council directly oversees provincial-level People's Governments, and in practice maintains membership with the top levels of the CCP. Aside from very few non-CCP ministers, members of the State Council are also members of the CCP's Central Committee.

Organization 

The State Council meets every six months. The standing committee includes the premier, one executive vice premier, three vice premiers, and five other state councillors (normally one of whom serves as Secretary-General of the State Council, and two of whom concurrently serve as ministers).

The vice-premiers and state councillors are nominated by the premier, and appointed by the president with National People's Congress' (NPC) approval. Incumbents may serve two successive five-year terms.

Each vice premier oversees certain areas of administration. Each State Councillor performs duties as designated by the Premier. The secretary-general heads the General Office which handles the day-to-day work of the State Council.  The secretary-general has relatively little power and should not be confused with the General Secretary of the Chinese Communist Party.

Each ministry supervises one sector. Commissions outrank ministries and set policies for and coordinate the related activities of different administrative organs. Offices deal with matters of ongoing concern. Bureaus and administrations rank below ministries.

In addition to the 25 ministries, there are 38 centrally administered government organizations that report directly to the state council. The heads of these organizations attend full meetings of the state committee on an irregular basis.

In practice, the vice premiers and State Councillors assume responsibility for one or more sectors or issues, and remain in contact with the various bodies responsible for policy related to that area. This allows the Standing Committee to oversee a wide range of government functions.

The State Council, like all other governmental bodies, is nominally responsible to the NPC and its Standing Committee in conducting a wide range of government functions both at the national and at the local levels, and nominally acts by virtue of the NPC's authority. In practice, however, the NPC had historically done little more than ratify decisions already made by the State Council. More recently, however, the NPC has taken on a more independent role. There has been at least one case where the NPC has outright rejected an initiative of the State Council and a few cases where the State Council has withdrawn or greatly modified a proposal in response to NPC opposition.

The State Council and the CCP are also tightly interlocked.  With rare exceptions, State Councillors are high-ranking members of the CCP. Although, as Party members, they are supposed to follow Party instructions, because they tend to be senior members of the Party they also have substantial influence over what those instructions are.  This results in a system which is unlike the Soviet practice in which the Party effectively controlled the State. Rather, the Party and State are fused at this level of government. The members of the State Council derive their authority from being members of the state, while as members of the Party they coordinate their activities and determine key decisions such as the naming of personnel.

There were attempts to separate the party and state in the late 1980s under Deng Xiaoping and Zhao Ziyang and have the Party in charge of formulating policy and the State Council executing policy, but these efforts were largely abandoned in the early 1990s.

As the chief administrative organ of government, its main functions are to formulate administrative measures, issue decisions and orders, and monitor their implementation; draft legislative bills for submission to the NPC or its Standing Committee; and prepare the economic plan and the state budget for deliberation and approval by the NPC. The State Council is the functional center of state power and clearinghouse for government initiatives at all levels. With the government's emphasis on economic modernization, the State Council clearly acquired additional importance and influence.

The State Council controls the Ministry for National Defense but does not control the People's Liberation Army, which is instead controlled by the Central Military Commission.

Members

Executive Meeting

Plenary Meeting 

The Plenary Meeting of State Council is hosted by the Premier, joined by Vice Premiers, State Councillors, Ministers in charge of Ministries and Commissions, the Governor of the People's Bank, the Auditor-General, and the Secretary General. It usually runs bi-annually and when necessary, non-members can be invited to participate.

Organizational structure

General Office of the State Council 

 Secretary-General of the State Council
 Deputy Secretaries-General of the State Council

Constituent Departments of the State Council (cabinet-level)

Special Organization directly under the State Council 
 Ministry-level
 State-owned Assets Supervision and Administration Commission of the State Council (SASAC), established in 2003

Organizations directly under the State Council 

 Ministry-level
 General Administration of Customs of the People's Republic of China
 State Administration of Taxation
 State Administration for Market Regulation
 National Radio and Television Administration
 General Administration of Sport 
 Counsellors' Office of the State Council

 Names reserved (formerly ministry-level)
 National Press and Publication Administration, additional name "National Copyright Administration", both names reserved by the CCP Central Propaganda Department

 Sub-ministry-level
 National Bureau of Statistics
 China International Development Cooperation Agency
 National Healthcare Security Administration
 National Government Offices Administration, formerly the "Government Offices Administration of the State Council"

 Names reserved (formerly sub-ministry-level)
 National Religious Affairs Administration, a name reserved by the CCP Central United Front Work Department

Administrative Offices of the State Council 

 Ministry-level
 Hong Kong and Macau Affairs Office of the State Council
 State Council Research Office

 Names reserved (formerly ministry-level)
 Overseas Chinese Affairs Office of the State Council, a name reserved by the CCP Central United Front Work Department
 Taiwan Affairs Office of the State Council, under the CCP Central Committee
 Cyberspace Administration of China, under the CCP Central Committee
 State Council Information Office, a name reserved by the CCP Central Publicity Department

Institutions directly under the State Council 

 Ministry-level
 Xinhua News Agency, administered by the CCP Central Publicity Department
 Chinese Academy of Sciences
 Chinese Academy of Engineering
 Chinese Academy of Social Sciences 
 Development Research Center of the State Council
 China Media Group, administered by the CCP Central Publicity Department
 China Banking and Insurance Regulatory Commission
 China Securities Regulatory Commission

 Names reserved (formerly ministry-level)
 Chinese Academy of Governance, a name reserved by the CCP Central Party School

 Sub-ministry-level
 China Meteorological Administration

National Administrations administrated by ministry-level agencies 

 Sub-ministry-level
 National Public Complaints and Proposals Administration (国家信访局), administrated by the State Council General Office
 National Food and Strategic Reserves Administration (国家粮食和物资储备局), administrated by the National Development and Reform Commission
 National Energy Administration, administrated by the National Development and Reform Commission
 State Administration of Science, Technology and Industry for National Defense, administrated by the Ministry of Industry and Information Technology
 State Tobacco Monopoly Administration (officially sharing its office with China National Tobacco Corporation), administrated by the Ministry of Industry and Information Technology
 National Immigration Administration, additional name "Exit and Entry Administration" for Mainland-Hong Kong-Macau-Taiwan border control, administrated by the Ministry of Public Security
 National Forestry and Grassland Administration, additional name "National Park Administration", administrated by the Ministry of Natural Resources
 National Railway Administration, administrated by the Ministry of Transport
 Civil Aviation Administration of China (CAAC), administrated by the Ministry of Transport
 State Post Bureau, administrated by the Ministry of Transport, officially sharing its office with China Post Group Corporation
 National Administration for Rural Revitalization (established on 25 February 2021), administrated by the Ministry of Agriculture and Rural Affairs
 National Cultural Heritage Administration, administrated by the Ministry of Culture and Tourism
 National Administration of Traditional Chinese Medicine, administrated by the National Health Commission
 National Bureau of Disease Control and Prevention (established on 13 May 2021), administrated by the National Health Commission
 National Mine Safety Administration (国家矿山安全监察局), administrated by the Ministry of Emergency Management
 State Administration of Foreign Exchange, administrated by the People's Bank of China
 National Medical Products Administration, formerly China Food and Drug Administration (CFDA), now administrated by the State Administration for Market Regulation
 National Intellectual Property Administration, administrated by the State Administration for Market Regulation

 Names reserved (formerly sub-ministry-level)
 National Civil Service Administration (国家公务员局), reserved by the Organization Department of the Chinese Communist Party
 National Archives Administration, i.e. the Central Archives (of the CCP), under the General Office of the CCP Central Committee
 National Administration of State Secrets Protection, i.e. the Office of the Central Secrecy Commission (of the CCP), under the General Office of the CCP Central Committee
 National Cryptography Administration (国家密码管理局), i.e. the Office of the Central Leading Group for Cryptography Work (of the CCP), under the General Office of the CCP Central Committee
 State Language Commission (国家语言文字工作委员会), reserved by the Ministry of Education
 State Administration of Foreign Experts Affairs, reserved by the Ministry of Science and Technology
 China National Space Administration, reserved by the Ministry of Industry and Information Technology
 China Atomic Energy Authority, reserved by the Ministry of Industry and Information Technology
 State Oceanic Administration, reserved by the Ministry of Natural Resources
 National Nuclear Safety Administration (国家核安全局), reserved by the Ministry of Ecology and Environment
 Certification and Accreditation Administration (国家认证认可监督管理委员会), reserved by the State Administration of Market Regulation
 Standardization Administration, reserved by the State Administration of Market Regulation

Interdepartmental coordinating agencies 
 National Defense Mobilization Commission (NDMC), established in 1994
 National Energy Commission (NEC), established in 2010
 Financial Stability and Development Committee (FSDC), established in 2017
and many more...

Agencies dispatched by the State Council 

 Ministry-level
 Liaison Office of the Central People's Government in the Hong Kong Special Administrative Region, established on 18 January 2000.
 Liaison Office of the Central People's Government in the Macao Special Administrative Region, established on 18 January 2000.

 Sub-ministry-level
 Office for Safeguarding National Security of the Central People's Government in the Hong Kong Special Administrative Region, established on 1 July 2020.

See also 

 Department of State Affairs in the Three Departments and Six Ministries system
 Ming dynasty: Central Secretariat → Grand Secretariat
 Qing dynasty: Grand Secretariat → Grand Council → Cabinet
 Republic of China: State Council (1912–28) → Executive Yuan (1928–present)
 People's Republic of China: Government Administration Council of the Central People's Government (1949–54); Ministries of the PRC

References

External links
 

 
China, People's Republic of, State Council
Government agencies established in 1954
1954 establishments in China